Huang Yi-Ling (born August 2, 1985) is a Taiwanese sport shooter. Huang represented Chinese Taipei at the 2008 Summer Olympics in Beijing, where she competed in two pistol shooting events.  She placed twenty-second out of forty-four shooters in the women's 10 m air pistol, with a total score of 379 points. Three days later, Tanova competed for her second event, 25 m pistol, where she was able to shoot 281 targets in the precision stage, and 282 in the rapid fire, for a total score of 563 points, finishing only in thirty-ninth place.

References

External links
NBC 2008 Olympics profile

Taiwanese female sport shooters
Living people
Olympic shooters of Taiwan
Shooters at the 2008 Summer Olympics
1985 births
Shooters at the 2006 Asian Games
Asian Games competitors for Chinese Taipei